Nashorn is a JavaScript engine developed in the Java programming language originally by Oracle and later by the OpenJDK Community. It relies on the support for dynamically typed languages on the Java Platform (JSR 292) (a concept first realized in the experimental Da Vinci Machine and a standard part of Java 7 and later.) Nashorn has been included with Java 8 through JDK 14.

History 
The project was announced first at the JVM language summit in July 2011, and then confirmed at JavaOne in October 2011. 

On November 21, 2012, Oracle formally announced the open sourcing of the Nashorn source on the OpenJDK repository. The project aim will be to allow embedding JavaScript in Java applications via JSR-223 and to develop standalone JavaScript applications. On December 21, 2012, Oracle announced Nashorn source was publicly released in the OpenJDK repository.

It provides a 100% support of ECMAScript 5.1. It was the first JavaScript implementation to achieve 100% pass rate on the ECMAScript 5.1 test suite.

With the release of Java 11, Nashorn was deprecated citing challenges to maintenance, and has been removed from JDK 15 onwards.

Nashorn development continues on GitHub as a standalone OpenJDK project and the separate release can be used in Java project from Java 11 and up.

Name
Nashorn  ("nahss-horn") is the German translation of rhinoceros, a play on words on Rhino, the name of a JavaScript engine implemented in Java and provided by Mozilla Foundation. The latter gets its name from the animal on the cover of the JavaScript book from O'Reilly Media.

Performance 
According to Oracle benchmarks, Nashorn performance is several orders of magnitude faster than the alternative Rhino JavaScript engine.

See also

List of ECMAScript engines

References

External links

JVM programming languages
JavaScript engines
Cross-platform software
Software using the GPL linking exception
Oracle software